Evert Karlsson Horn af Kanckas (11 June 1585 – 30 July 1615) was a Swedish  Field Marshal and Governor of Narva.

Biography
He was born at Haapsalu Castle in  the Swedish province of Estonia. He was a son of Field Marshal Carl Horn and Agneta von Dellwig. His younger brother was Field Marshal Gustav Horn, Count of Pori (1592–1657).

In 1608, Horn was assigned to service with  Jakob De la Gardie (1583–1652),  Chief Commander in Finland.
Evert Horn was appointed Governor (Ståthållare) of Narva in 1613 and Field Marshal in 1614. During the Ingrian War, he was killed by a bullet during the early days of the Swedish 
siege of Pskov in 1615.

Personal life
In 1613, he married Margareta Fincke  (ca. 1611-1647), daughter of Governor Gödik Fincke  (ca. 1546–1617) and his first wife Ingeborg Boije (ca. 1550-1580). Their son Gustav Evertsson Horn af Marienborg (1614–1666) was a member of the  Privy Council of Sweden and Governor General of Finland.

See also
Horn family
De la Gardie Campaign

References

External links

1585 births
1615 deaths
People from Haapsalu
16th-century Swedish nobility
Field marshals of Sweden
17th-century Swedish military personnel
People of the Swedish Empire
17th-century Swedish nobility